ECN may refer to:

Organizations, companies 

ECN (TV station), now NEN, in New South Wales, Australia
ECN Capital, a Canadian financing company
Electoral Commission of Namibia
Energy Research Centre of the Netherlands
Environmental Change Network, of the British Natural Environment Research Council
Ercan International Airport, in Northern Cyprus
European Competition Network
European Crowdfunding Network

Computing 

 Electronic communication network
 Explicit Congestion Notification
 Encoding Control Notation

Transportation 

 Ethernet Consist Network, Ethernet protocol used in train communications

Other 

 Electrochemical noise
 Engineering change notice
 Enhanced capital note
 Eastman Color Negative